Inferum is a Dutch death metal band from Eindhoven, formed in 2015.

Biography 
Inferum was founded in 2015 by vocalist Morrison de Boer and lead guitarist Lars Deelman. They both studied at the Metal Factory in Eindhoven.

In 2017 Inferum represented the Netherlands in the W:O:A Metal Battle (also known as Wacken Metal Battle): a worldwide metal music competition by Wacken Open Air. The band went on to win third prize, giving their country the highest ranking it had achieved in the W:O:A Metal Battle so far.
In the same year Inferum released their first EP: Modern Massacre.  The band also appeared on Dutch festivals Baroeg Open Air, Occultfest, and Stonehenge Festival.

Band members

Current members 
 Morrison de Boer – vocals
 David Luiten – guitar
 Remco Schouten – guitar
 Ozzy Voskuilen – bass guitar (formerly rhythm guitar)
 Wouter Macare – drums

Former members 
 Lars Deelman – lead guitar
 Stan Albers – bass guitar

Discography

Albums
 Human Disposal (2019)

EP's 
 Modern Massacre (2017)

Singles 
 Autophagia with guest vocals of CJ McMahon from Thy Art Is murder (2018)
 Beyond Reach (2019)

References

External links 
 
 Inferum at Encyclopaedia Metallum

Dutch death metal musical groups
Musical groups from Eindhoven
Musical groups established in 2015